Southwest Human Development is a nonprofit organization focused on early child development, including mental health, child literacy, education, disability services and child welfare. It is located in Phoenix, Arizona, and is the second largest nonprofit organization in the city.

History 
Southwest Human Development was founded in 1981 with six staff members, a small budget of $150,000 and a single support program, serving 175 families. By 1988, the organization had grown to 120 staff members and a budget of $3.5 million. By 1993 it grew to about 230 staff members with a budget of $6.7 million, and by 1996 that had grown to 300 staff members with a budget of $13 million, serving 12,000 families. In 2003, the organization obtained and renovated a 50,000 square foot facility in Phoenix, which is currently used at its headquarters. By 2004, the organization had grown to 450 staff members, with a budget of $23 million, serving 50,000 families. By 2006, more than 40 development and outreach programs had been initiated. In 2007, Southwest Human Development became an affiliate of Easter Seals. In 2010, the organization had grown to 650 staff members, with over 100 programs. Currently, the organization has grown to a staff of over 900, with a budget of $72 million, serving 135,000 families annually.

See also
Easter Seals (US)
Reach Out and Read
Head Start Program
Nurse-Family Partnership
Erikson Institute

References

External links 
Official Website

Non-profit organizations based in Arizona
501(c)(3) organizations